The 1958 Tennessee gubernatorial election was held on November 4, 1958. Democratic nominee Buford Ellington defeated Independent Jim Nance McCord with 57.54% of the vote.

Primary elections
Primary elections were held on August 7, 1958.

Democratic primary

Candidates
Buford Ellington, State Representative
Andrew T. "Tip" Taylor
Edmund Orgill, Mayor of Memphis
Clifford Allen, State Senator
Jake Armstrong 	
John Hickey
G. Edward Friar
Edward Brown

Results

General election

Candidates
Major party candidates
Buford Ellington, Democratic
Tom Wall, Republican 

Other candidates
Jim Nance McCord, Independent
Allen Bell, Independent
Thomas E. Cook, Independent
Herbert P. Moore, Independent
Paul David Warwick, Independent
Lee R. Foster, Independent
John Randolph Neal Jr., Independent

Results

References

1958
Tennessee
Gubernatorial
November 1958 events in the United States